Emotional Fire is the third album from Sunstorm, an AOR project formed by former Rainbow singer Joe Lynn Turner and featuring members of German rock band Pink Cream 69. On Emotional Fire, Turner pays tribute to his 1980's sessions as a backing vocalist for the likes of Michael Bolton and Cher. The album was released on February 28, 2012, by Frontiers Records.

Track list
 Never Give Up	 (3:44)	(Robert Säll, Sören Kronqvist)
 Emotional Fire (3:52) (Michael Bolton, Diane Warren, Desmond Child)
 Lay Down Your Arms (3:47) (Johan Stentorp)
 You Wouldn't Know Love (3:51) (Michael Bolton, Diane Warren)
 Wish You Were Here (3:35) (Daniel Palmqvist)
 Torn In Half (3:51) (Sören Kronqvist)
 Gina (4:00) (Michael Bolton, Keith Diamond, Bob Halligan Jr.)
 The Higher You Raise (3:59) (Robert Säll, Daniel Palmqvist, Sören Kronqvist)
 Emily (3:45) (Sören Kronqvist)
 Follow Your Heart (4:03) (Sören Kronqvist)
 All I Am (4:00) (James Martin, Mikey Wilson, Tom Martin, Isabell Oversveen)
 The Silence  (Japanese Edition Bonus Track)

Personnel

 Joe Lynn Turner - vocals
 Dennis Ward - guitars, bass, backing vocals
 Uwe Reitenauer - guitars
 Chris Schmidt - drums
 Justin Dakey - keyboards

Production notes
 Produced and mixed by Dennis Ward at CrakShak
 Executive producer: Serafino Perugino
 Mastered by Dennis Ward
 Vocals produced by Tom Merlynn and Joe Lynn Turner
 Vocals recorded by Tom Merlynn at TKL Studios
 Vocals executive producer: Mark Wexler

References

2012 albums
Sunstorm (band) albums
Frontiers Records albums
Albums produced by Dennis Ward (musician)